Gary W. Cox (born 23 September 1955), born in Maryland, is a political scientist, the William Bennett Munro Professor of Political Science at Stanford University.

He qualified as a Ph.D., California Institute of Technology, in 1983, was elected a Guggenheim Fellow in 1995, elected to the American Academy of Arts and Sciences in 1996, and was elected to the National Academy of Sciences in 2005.

Publications
The Efficient Secret, winner of the 1983 Samuel H. Beer dissertation prize and the 2003 George H. Hallett Award
Legislative Leviathan (w/ Mathew D. McCubbins), Cambridge University Press (1993);  winner of the 1993 Richard F Fenno Prize
Making Votes Count Cambridge University Press (2002) . winner of the 1998 Woodrow Wilson Foundation Award, the 1998 Luebbert Prize and the 2007 George H. Hallett Award
Setting the Agenda (w/ Mathew D. McCubbins), Cambridge University Press (2003); winner of the 2006 Leon D. Epstein Book Award
Marketing Sovereign Promises: Monopoly Brokerage and the Growth of the English State, Cambridge University Press (2016)
Mixed-Member Electoral Systems in Constitutional Context: Taiwan, Japan, and Beyond, with Nathan F. Batto, Chi Huang, and Alexander C. Tan, editors.  University of Michigan Press (2016).  .

Sources

References 

1955 births
American political philosophers
Living people
American political scientists